Oyunbaatar Mijiddorj (born 22 August 1996) is a Mongolian footballer who plays for the Khangarid FC of the Mongolian Premier League, and the Mongolian national team.

Club career
Mijiddorj has played for Khangarid FC of the Mongolian Premier League since 2010. He was the league's top scorer for the 2016 season with 29 goals in 18 appearances. He also received the award for top forward in the league that year.

In July 2017 he joined Mongolian side Ulaanbaatar City FC along with fellow national team player Murun Altankhuyag.

International career
Mijiddorj made his senior international debut on 3 November 2016 in a 1–2 defeat to Macau in the 2016 AFC Solidarity Cup. He scored his first goal on 7 June 2021 against Kyrgyzstan in their 1–0 win.

International career statistics

References

External links
 
 Mongolian Football Federation profile
 

1996 births
Living people
Mongolian footballers
Mongolia international footballers
Association football forwards
Ulaanbaatar City FC players
Mongolian National Premier League players